Crossed may refer to:

 Crossed (comics), a 2008 comic book series by Garth Ennis
 Crossed (novel), a 2010 young adult novel by Ally Condie
 "Crossed" (The Walking Dead), an episode of the television series The Walking Dead

See also
Cross (disambiguation)